Esky is a trademarked brand of portable cooler from Australia

Esky or Eskies may also refer to:

 a nickname for the Edmonton Eskimos of the Canadian Football League
 a nickname for the city of Escanaba, Michigan
 also a nickname of the city's high school, Escanaba Senior High School
 a nickname or mascot of Esquire
 "The Esky", a nickname of Nick Malceski (born 1984), former Australian rules footballer
 Esky, a character in the 1980s animated TV series Snorks